"Shove" is a 1990 song by all-female rock band L7, from the album Smell the Magic. The cover photo was shot by notable music photographer Charles Peterson.

Track listing
 "Shove" (Gardner, Sparks)
 "Packin' a Rod" (Morrow)

Accolades

Personnel
Donita Sparks – guitar, 
Suzi Gardner – lead vocals, guitar
Jennifer Finch – bass guitar
Demetra Plakas – drums

References

External links
 

1990 songs
1990 singles
L7 (band) songs
Songs written by Donita Sparks
Sub Pop singles